Easter Proclamation may refer to:
The Exsultet, a Christian hymn intoned by the deacon during the Easter Vigil in western-rite churches.
The Proclamation of the Irish Republic, issued during the Easter Rising in Ireland.